Cheap Trick, commonly referred to as Cheap Trick '97, is the second eponymous album, and thirteenth studio album, by the American rock band Cheap Trick, produced by the band and Ian Taylor and released on Red Ant Records and Alliance Entertainment. The album is referred to as "Cheap Trick II" when it is referenced on the promotional DVD that was released with the band's Special One album in 2003. Ian Taylor had previously engineered the One On One LP in 1982 and produced a handful of other tracks from 1983's Next Position Please LP, as well as the title track for the 1983 Sean S. Cunningham comedy film Spring Break.

Background
The album features a black-and-white themed cover and a stripped-down sound reminiscent of the band's eponymous debut album 20 years earlier. It was named after the 1977 debut. Rick Nielsen and Bun E. Carlos are represented on the front cover (rather than the back) of a Cheap Trick album for the first and only time, likewise Robin Zander and Tom Petersson are relegated to the back, but their gear appears instead of the band members themselves. Some have suggested that the band chose this approach treating their debut with Red Ant/Alliance as an opportunity to re-introduce themselves as a band to a new era. Red Ant filed for bankruptcy three weeks after the album's release. There was one black-and-white video shot for the LP; "Say Goodbye". The Japanese version of the album featured a different album cover, a black-and-white photo of the band members. The CD features outtake material before the beginning of the first track, accessible only through older model CD players; pressing pause as the first track begins and scanning backwards will reveal snippets of outtakes from several songs on the album.

Speaking of the album to Billboard in 1997, Nielsen commented: "This is the first album of the second half of our career. We have a past, but we have a future as well. We are still angry and hungry; it is still exciting for us." Randy Phillips, the president of Red Ant, commented: "They have made a great album. I couldn't be happier to have them on our label. Cheap Trick is one of the best live acts in the business."

Reception

Upon release, David Fricke of Rolling Stone wrote: "Give this one time and volume; you'll come to love it. The dark heart and barbed-guitar snag of this Cheap Trick sneak up on you. More toxic-guitar ravers like "Baby No More" would have been cool, but that's a minor beef. After all this time, these guys have still got it. You should get it." Paul Verna of Billboard said: "Cheap Trick is a glorious, tabula rasa return to form. Much that is classic and still contemporary about the band is on record here. This disc merits Cheap Trick a renewed heyday in a rock world as primed for princely power pop as it ever has been."

Stephen Thomas Erlewine of AllMusic considered the album a "fine, distinguished comeback" and added: "Cheap Trick is indeed [the band's] most powerful, direct and melodic album in years. Cheap Trick keep their sound to the basics - loud guitars, crunching chords, and sweet melodies. The real key to the success of Cheap Trick is the reinvigorated songwriting and the result is a tight, melodic set of hard rockers and ballads." Steven Mirkin of Entertainment Weekly commented: "Cheap Trick try to re-create the hard-driving, baroque pop sound of their heyday. But this tentative, power-pop-by-the-numbers effort lacks the smarts and energy that gave "Surrender" and "I Want You to Want Me" its indelible charm. Only "Say Goodbye" and "Carnival Game" approach the earlier material's heady rush."

Track listing
All tracks by Rick Nielsen, Tom Petersson & Robin Zander except where noted.

This album came with a hidden "track 0" which is a 2:58 montage of clips of songs on the album and studio banter. 
Some copies of this album came with a bonus disc that contained two songs that were produced by Steve Albini. "Baby Talk" was written by Rick Nielsen, Robin Zander, and Tom Petersson. "Brontosaurus" is a 1970 song by The Move, written by Roy Wood. The tracks were originally released on 7-inch vinyl by Sub Pop Records in early 1997. They are also bonus tracks on the Japanese and digital download versions of the album.

Singles
All singles were released as promotional singles only.

 (1997) "Say Goodbye/Yeah Yeah" - #119 US, #39 US Mainstream Rock
 (1997) "Baby No More/Anytime/Brontosaurus"
 (1997) "Carnival Game/You Let a Lotta People Down"

Personnel

Cheap Trick

 Robin Zander – lead vocals, acoustic guitar, electric guitar, baritone guitar, slide guitar, tiple, piano
 Rick Nielsen – backing vocals, electric guitar, acoustic guitar, E-bow, piano, electric saw
 Tom Petersson – backing vocals, bass, 12-string bass, acoustic guitar, electric guitar, baritone guitar, E-bow, tamboura
 Bun E. Carlos – drums, tambourine

Additional musicians
 Mike Beert – cello (track 4)
 Richie Cannata – piano (track 11)

Technical
 Ian Taylor – producer, engineer, mixing
 George Fullan, Rob Polhemus, Glenn Preston – assistant engineers
 Bob Ludwig – mastering
 Pumpkinhead – art direction
 Geoffroy De Boismenu – photography
 Mike Graham – cover photography

Charts

References 

Cheap Trick albums
1997 albums